The Lime CD is David Crowder Band's first live album and fifth overall. It is a combination of their previous two live EPs, The Green CD and The Yellow CD, with the addition of two previously unreleased tracks.

Track listing

Chart positions

References 

David Crowder Band albums
2004 EPs